Yunus Emre Sonsırma (born October 8, 1992) is a Turkish professional basketball player for Bahçeşehir Koleji of the Turkish Basketbol Süper Ligi (BSL).

Professional career

Galatasaray Nef (2022–2023)
On 27 June 2022, he has signed with Galatasaray Nef of the Turkish Basketbol Süper Ligi (BSL).

In the notification made by Galatasaray Nef on 27 January 2023, it was announced that the transfer offer from Bahçeşehir Koleji for Sonsırma was accepted.

Bahçeşehir Koleji (2023–)
On 27 January 2023, it was announced that he was transferred to Bahçeşehir Koleji.

Turkish national team
He played for the Turkey U-20 National Team.

References

External links
 TBL Profile

1992 births
Bahçeşehir Koleji S.K. players
Büyükçekmece Basketbol players
Eskişehir Basket players
Living people
Darüşşafaka Basketbol players
Galatasaray S.K. (men's basketball) players
Karşıyaka basketball players
Point guards
Turkish men's basketball players
Türk Telekom B.K. players